The 2001 Kazakhstan Cup Final was the ninth final of the Kazakhstan Cup. The match was contested by Zhenis and Irtysh at Kazhimukan Munaitpasov Stadium in Astana. The match was played on 17 June 2001 and was the final match of the competition.

Background
Zhenis played the first Kazakhstan Cup Final.

Irtysh played the second Kazakhstan Cup Final. In the first final they won Kaisar-Hurricane with the score 2-1.

2000 domestic association football cups
2000 in Kazakhstani football
2001 domestic association football cups
2001 in Kazakhstani football
Kazakhstan Cup Finals
Kazakhstan Cup Final 2000-01